The 2021–22 President's Cup is the 68th season of the President's Cup.

Teams
All teams playing in the 2021–22 Dhivehi Premier League.

Format
Eight teams competing will be engaged in a round-robin tournament, each team plays once against the others. Three points are awarded for a win, one for a draw and zero for a loss. The teams are ranked in the league table by points gained, then goal difference, then goals scored and then their head-to-head record. The top 2 teams will be qualified for the Final.

League Round
A total of 28 matches will be played in this round.

Standings

Updated to match(es) played on 25 December 2021. Source: President's Cup

Positions by round
The table lists the positions of teams after each week of matches.

Last updated: 25 December 2021

Matches

Week 1

Week 2

Week 3

Week 4

Week 5

Week 6

Week 7

Final

References

External links
Official Facebook page

President's Cup (Maldives)
Pres
Pres